Bonjour Kathrin (or Bonjour, Kathrin) is a 1956 West German musical film directed by Karl Anton and starring Caterina Valente, Peter Alexander and . It is based on the operetta Die glücklichste Frau der Welt by Max Wallner and Kurt Feltz. It was shot in Eastmancolor at the Wiesbaden Studios in Hesse. The film's sets were designed by the art directors Andrej Andrejew and Helmut Nentwig.

Cast
Caterina Valente as Kathrin
Peter Alexander as Pierre
 as Silvio
Dietmar Schönherr as Duval
Rudolf Vogel as Fogar
Helen Vita as Denise
Hans-Joachim Kulenkampff as Columbus
Rolf Olsen as Lebaudi
Sabine Hahn as Therese
Kurt Edelhagen and his Orchestra as themselves

Reception
The FSK gave the film a rating of "6 and up" and deemed it suitable for screening on public holidays.

The film premiered on 31 January 1956 at the Ufa-Palast in Essen.

References

Bibliography

External links

1956 musical comedy films
German musical comedy films
West German films
Films directed by Karl Anton
Films based on operettas
Films about singers
UFA GmbH films
1950s German-language films
1950s German films